Shinee World 2014 (promoted as SHINEE WORLD 2014 ~I'M YOUR BOY~ IN TOKYO DOME) is the third Japan nationwide concert tour by South Korean boy band Shinee, to promote their third Japanese studio album I'm Your Boy. The tour kicked off in Chiba on September 28, 2014, and ended on December 19 in Hyogo, with a total of 30 concerts in 20 cities. On March 14 and 15, 2015, Shinee performed at the Tokyo Dome for the finale performance, which was also their first time performing at the venue. The tour was attended by a total of 300,000 fans.

On July 1, 2015, SM Entertainment released the DVD Blu-Ray version, titled Shinee World 2014 ～I'm Your Boy～ Special Edition in Tokyo Dome. Upon release, it peaked at number one on the Japanese charts, and as of 2015, it had sold more than 27,000 copies worldwide.

Set list

Shows

DVD

Chart performance

References

External links
SM Entertainment - Official website
Shinee - Official South Korean website
Shinee - Official Japanese website

Shinee concert tours
2014 concert tours
SM Entertainment video albums